Diaulula odonoghuei, the spotted leopard dorid, is a species of dorid nudibranch found in the Pacific Ocean. Identified as a cryptic species in 2016, it is differentiated from its sister species Diaulula sandiegensis by having considerably more spots on their mantle.

Description 
This nudibranch grows to about 100 mm (4") in length with many spots covering its mantle, this pattern can extend all the way to the edge of the mantle, a defining characteristic of this cryptic species

Distribution 
This dorid nudibranch ranges from the sea of japan to northern California.

Life habits 
This species feeds on sponges.

References

odonoghuei
Gastropods described in 1963